Krishnahari Baral (born 4 January 1954) is a Nepali lyricist, songwriter, poet, literary critic, and author who is professor of Nepali at Central Department of Nepali, Tribhuwan University, Kathmandu. Dr. Baral has written more than forty books including course books, literary criticisms, and collection of lyric poetry.

References

External links
Krishnahari Baral, official website

1954 births
Living people
Nepalese musicians
Nepalese male poets
Nepalese literary critics
People from Sindhuli District
Nepalese songwriters
21st-century Nepalese poets
Lyric poets
Nepali-language lyricists